Alejandra Torres-Quevedo Oliver (born 30 September 1999) is a field hockey player from Spain, who plays as a midfielder.

Career

Club hockey
Alejandra Torres-Quevedo plays hockey for Club de Campo in the División de Honor in Spain.

National teams

Under–21
In 2016, Torres-Quevedo was a member of the Spanish Under–21 team at the FIH Junior World Cup in Santiago.

She followed this up with an appearance at the 2017 EuroHockey Junior Championship in Valencia, where the team finished fifth.

Red Sticks
Torres-Quevedo made her debut for the Spanish national team, the 'Red Sticks', in 2017.

2019 was Torres-Quevedo's most prominent year with the national side, winning her first medal with the team at the FIH Series Finals in Valencia, taking home gold. This was followed up with a bronze medal performance at the EuroHockey Championships in Antwerp.

References

External links
 
 
 
 

1999 births
Living people
Female field hockey defenders
Spanish female field hockey players
Field hockey players at the 2020 Summer Olympics
Olympic field hockey players of Spain